

Mark Kinser (born May 5, 1964) is a retired American sprint car racing driver. He hails from Oolitic, Indiana.

Cousin to Steve Kinser, Mark won the 1996 and 1999 World of Outlaws championship and was runner-up in 1991, 1998, and 2001. Mark is the 1996, 1999, and 2000 Knoxville Nationals champion as well as the 2001 King's Royal winner. 
In 2006, one of the World of Outlaws Sprint Car Series’ most successful drivers suddenly retired. After winning 153 features, standing on the podium 214 times, capturing the famed Knoxville Nationals three times and being crowned WoO champion in 1996 and 1999 he suddenly retired from professional racing.

Mark is fourth on the all-time wins list with 153 A-feature wins, behind Donny Schatz, Sammy Swindell and cousin Steve, respectively.

In 1997, Mark attempted to qualify for four NASCAR Craftsman Truck Series races, driving the No. 92 Chevrolet for SKB Racing, but failed to qualify for any of them. Unlike his cousin, Steve, or Kraig Kinser, Mark Kinser never ventured into NASCAR Sprint Cup or IndyCar.

In 2014, Mark was inducted into the National Sprint Car Hall of Fame.

Motorsports career results

NASCAR
(key) (Bold - Pole position awarded by time. Italics - Pole position earned by points standings. * – Most laps led.)

Craftsman Truck Series

References

External links

Driver DB Profile

Living people
1964 births
People from Lawrence County, Indiana
Racing drivers from Indiana
World of Outlaws drivers
NASCAR drivers
Bedford North Lawrence High School alumni